Marjan Jelenko (born 22 July 1991 in Maribor) is a Slovenian former Nordic combined skier and junior world champion.

He won a gold medal and a silver medal at the Junior World Championships in Otepää in 2011. At the FIS Nordic World Ski Championships 2011 in Oslo, Jelenko finished 27th in the 10 km individual normal hill event.

References

External links

1991 births
Living people
Slovenian male Nordic combined skiers
Nordic combined skiers at the 2014 Winter Olympics
Nordic combined skiers at the 2018 Winter Olympics
Olympic Nordic combined skiers of Slovenia
Sportspeople from Maribor
21st-century Slovenian people